Vjekoslav "Yakka" Banović (born 12 November 1956) is a former Association footballer who played two matches for the Australia national soccer team. He is of Croatian descent.

References

1956 births
Living people
Australian soccer players
National Soccer League (Australia) players
English Football League players
Brunswick Juventus players
Derby County F.C. players
Heidelberg United FC players
Melbourne Knights FC players
Croats of Bosnia and Herzegovina
Bosnia and Herzegovina emigrants to Australia
Association football goalkeepers
Australian expatriate soccer players
Expatriate footballers in England
Australian expatriate sportspeople in England
Australia B international soccer players
Australia international soccer players
1980 Oceania Cup players